The Jukola Relay is an orienteering relay race held annually in Finland since 1949. Jukola is the biggest orienteering relay event in the world. The race takes place on a Saturday between the 13th and 19th of June in different sites around Finland. The northernmost location has been 50 km north of the Arctic Circle. The name Jukola is a family name in the classic Finnish novel, "Seven Brothers". The women's relay, known as the Venla Relay, is a daytime race on the Saturday afternoon. It is named after the main female character from the novel.

The Jukola relay has seven legs with distances varying from 7 to 15 km. The starting time is around 11 pm when the sun sets. Runners for the first three legs usually wear headlights, depending on the geographical site (north or south of Finland) of the relay and the weather conditions. The winning team crosses the finishing line early on Sunday morning, around 6 or 7 am, and the last teams finish just before the finish is closed in the afternoon. Women can participate in the Jukola relay in non-official teams (non-sports club teams, like company, family or other teams).

For the women, an individual race with a mass start was organized in 1951. This was turned into a three leg relay race in 1978 and then a four leg relay race in 1981. 
In 2012 the Jukola relay attracted close to 1700 teams and the Venla relay more than 1250. Clubs from 20 different countries took part.

The "Kaukametsäläiset" association is the founder of the Jukola relay and it is also the owner of the rights to the Jukola event.

The Youth Jukola relay
Since 1986, a Jukola relay event for young orienteers has been organized as a separate event in August each year. The Youth Jukola relay is the world's most attended junior orienteering relay.

History of Jukola and Venla

Upcoming events

References

Further reading
Uljas, Reimo: Jukolan viestit 1989 - 2008 with English summary, Kaukametsälaiset ry 2009,

External links

Jukola relay

Orienteering in Finland
Orienteering relay races
Recurring sporting events established in 1949